Iridopsis pergracilis, the cypress looper moth, is a moth of the  family Geometridae. The species was first described by George Duryea Hulst in 1900. It is found in the US from Maryland to Florida.

The wingspan is 26–28 mm. Adults have whitish or pale tan wings with black antemedial and postmedial lines, often bordered by dark gray shading. In southern Florida, adults are on wing year round.

The larvae feed on Taxodium distichum (including Taxodium distichum var. nutans). They feed on parts of or entire leaves of their host plant. Prior to pupation, last instar larvae chew shallow depressions into the bark and form a cocoon of silk webbing and bark fibers. Pupation occurs on tree stems and branches. They are light grayish with reddish-brown dorsal patches bordered by a subdorsal black stripe.

Gallery

References

Moths described in 1900
Boarmiini
Moths of North America